This is a list of properties and districts in Berrien County, Georgia that are listed on the National Register of Historic Places (NRHP).

Current listings

|}

References

Berrien
Berrien County, Georgia
National Register of Historic Places in Berrien County, Georgia